Tinidazole is a drug used against protozoan infections. It is widely known throughout Europe and the developing world as a treatment for a variety of anaerobic amoebic and bacterial infections. It was developed in 1972 and is a prominent member of the nitroimidazole antibiotic class.

It is on the World Health Organization's List of Essential Medicines.

Tinidazole is marketed by Mission Pharmacal under the brand name Tindamax, by Pfizer under the names Fasigyn and Simplotan, and in some Asian countries as Sporinex.

Uses
Tinidazole may be a therapeutic alternative in the setting of metronidazole intolerance.  Tinidazole is used to treat Helicobacter pylori, Amoebic dysentery, Giardia and Trichomonas vaginalis.

Side effects 
Drinking alcohol while taking tinidazole causes an unpleasant disulfiram-like reaction, which includes nausea, vomiting, headache, increased blood pressure, flushing, and shortness of breath.

Half-life 
Elimination half-life is 13.2 ± 1.4 hours. Plasma half-life is 12 to 14 hours.

References

Antiprotozoal agents
Disulfiram-like drugs
Nitroimidazole antibiotics
Sulfones
World Health Organization essential medicines